Deivi ("Deivis") Julio Blanco (born April 12, 1980) is a Colombian amateur boxer best known to qualify for the 2008 Summer Olympics in the Heavyweight (201 lbs limit) division.

Career
At the PanAm Games 2007 the tall Julio ran into dominant Osmay Acosta early and lost 2:10.
At the World Championships 2007 he suffered the ultimate humiliation when he was blitzed in a mere 15 seconds of round 1 by Elchin Alizade.

At the first Olympic qualifier he was edged out by Deontay Wilder 5:6 but when Wilder and Acosta both qualified the 26-year-old seized the opportunity at the second qualifier to defeat Alcivar Ayovi, Alexander Vellon and Hamilton Ventura to win the tournament.
He lost his Olympic bout to John M'Bumba 5:11.

He won a silver medal in the heavyweight class at the 2015 Pan American Games.

References

External links
 
 
 
 American Olympic Qualifications - Guatemala City, Guatemala - April 25-30 2008. "Deivis Julio".
 

1980 births
Living people
Colombian male boxers
Heavyweight boxers
Olympic boxers of Colombia
Boxers at the 2008 Summer Olympics
Pan American Games silver medalists for Colombia
Pan American Games medalists in boxing
Boxers at the 2007 Pan American Games
Boxers at the 2011 Pan American Games
Boxers at the 2015 Pan American Games
Boxers at the 2019 Pan American Games
South American Games gold medalists for Colombia
South American Games medalists in boxing
Competitors at the 2018 South American Games
Central American and Caribbean Games silver medalists for Colombia
Central American and Caribbean Games bronze medalists for Colombia
Competitors at the 2014 Central American and Caribbean Games
Competitors at the 2018 Central American and Caribbean Games
Central American and Caribbean Games medalists in boxing
Medalists at the 2015 Pan American Games
21st-century Colombian people